Social Christian Party may refer to:

 Social Christian Party (Bolivia)
 Social Christian Party (Brazil)
 Social Christian Party (Ecuador)
 Social Christian Party (Italy)
 Social Christian Party (Nicaragua)
 Social Christian Party (Ukraine)
 Christian Social Party (Belgium, defunct) (Parti social chrétien)

See also 
 Christian Social Party (disambiguation)

Political party disambiguation pages